The Library Association of Ireland (LAI) is a professional body representing librarians in the Republic of Ireland.  It was founded in 1928.

Objectives
The Association works to develop high standards of librarianship and library information services in Ireland, and increase co-operation between libraries. It also represents the interests of its members in dealings with local governments and the Government of Ireland.

The Association provides conferences, courses, examinations and certifications in library science to its members. giving recognition to degrees, diplomas or other professional qualifications in librarianship, and by conducting courses of study, setting examinations to test the proficiency of candidates, and issuing diplomas.

Membership
The Association has personal and institutional memberships. Personal members include professionals, para-professionals, international, students, and fraternal. Institutional members include libraries, library schools, corporate and government bodies, and institutions or societies. 

There is also the Honorary Life Membership and Honorary Fellowship of the Association, for those who have made significant contributions to the library profession and or to the Library Association of Ireland.

Activities
The association publishes a journal, An Leabharlann – The Irish Library, and organises regular conferences.

The Association participates in annual LAI and CILIP (Chartered Institute of Library and Information Professionals) Ireland Annual Joint Conferences. The LAI also organises an annual Library Ireland Week to celebrate libraries. In 2021 the LAI announced that it had agreed to sponsor a category at the An Post Irish Book Awards.  The new category, LAI Author of the Year, is awarded to an Irish author whose works contributed significantly to the reader experience and enjoyment of Irish books during the year, as nominated by librarians and library book club members. The LAI awards a number of professional awards and a President's medal to recognise and celebrate an individual who, while not directly working in libraries, has an exceptional track record of promoting libraries and/or issues of interest or concern to libraries. The inaugural recipient of the President's medal was the President of Ireland Michael D Higgins who was presented with the medal at Áras an Uachtaráin on 12 June 2022.

In 2019 it was announced that the LAI would host the IFLA World Library and Information Congress in Dublin in 2020.  However, in early 2020 this was postponed due to the COVID-19 pandemic until July 2022.

Governance
The Association's current president is Cathal McCauley, who is University Librarian at Maynooth University.

Notable members
 Beatrice Doran, former chief librarian at the Royal College of Surgeons in Ireland and former president of the LAI
 Róisín Walsh, (1889–1949) Dublin's first chief librarian.

Publications
Books published by the Library Association of Ireland include:
 Accent on Access : Proceedings of an Irish Joint Conference held 19–22 April 1994 in Enniskillen
 Books Beyond the Pale: Aspects of the Provincial Book Trade in Ireland Before 1850 
 The Borrowers at School: A Report on Primary School Libraries
 Celtic Connections: Proceedings of the Conference held 4th – 7th June, 1996 in Peebles 
 Commitment to Quality: Proceedings of an Irish joint conference held in Cork, 19–23 April 1993 
 Consumer Health Information Database Feasibility 
 Directory of Libraries & Information Services in Ireland; 5th Ed. 
 Information for Health: Access to Healthcare Information Services in Ireland. A Research Report on the Information needs of Healthcare Professionals and the Public 
 Libraries – Information and Imagination : Proceedings of an Irish Joint Conference held 25–28 April 1995 
 Library Development in Second Level Schools : Seminar Proceedings 
 Library File: Making a Success of the School Library
 Public Information in Private Places: Proceedings of the 1997 Annual Joint Conference held in Letterkenny Co Donegal, 22nd – 25th April, 1997
 School Libraries: Guidelines for Good  
 Standards for Irish Health Care Libraries and Information Services (2nd ed., 2005) 
 Standards for Irish Health Care Libraries 
 Striving for Excellence: Proceedings of an Irish Joint Conference held 27th April – 1st May, 1992 in Malahide, Co. Dublin 
 Towards the Global Library: Networking Revolution in Action. Seminar proceedings 12–20 March 1992 
 Well Read: Developing Consumer Health Information in Ireland 

The An Leabharlann is the journal published by the Library Association of Ireland. In the year 2013, the journal became available electronically. Currently the journal has published 26 volumes and 51 issues.

References

External links
 

Professional associations based in Ireland
1928 establishments in Ireland
Organizations established in 1972
Library associations
Seanad nominating bodies